C. S. Monroe Technology Center was a part-time, vocational secondary school located in Leesburg, a town in Loudoun County, Virginia. It was part of the Loudoun County Public School system, and it is a Virginia Governor's STEM Academy. The school closed in June 2018, however the programs and courses are now offered through the Academies of Loudoun, which opened in August 2018. Demolition of the building started at the beginning of February 2020.

Structure 

Students attended C. S. Monroe Technology Center every other school day. On the remaining days, they attended the non-magnet high school determined by typical attendance boundaries.

References

External links 
 

Schools in Loudoun County, Virginia
Alternative schools in the United States
Public high schools in Virginia
Magnet schools in Virginia